Louis Paul Galambos (born April 4, 1931) is an American historian known for his contributions to business history. He is a professor emeritus in the Department of History and editor of The Papers of Dwight David Eisenhower (21 volumes) at Johns Hopkins University, where he has worked since 1971. He previously served as an Assistant Professor (1960-1966), Associate Professor (1966-1969), and Professor (1969-1970) at Rice University. He also served as a Professor (1970-1971) at Rutgers University.

Along with Rondo Cameron, Galambos served as co-editor for the Journal of Economic History from 1975 to 1978.

Education
Galambos earned a B.A. in history (1955) from Indiana University, an M.A. in history (1957) and Ph.D. (1960) from Yale University.

Publications

Books

Articles
"The McNamara Bank and Its Legacy, 1968-1987". Business History Review. 1995.
"Global Perspectives on Modern Business". Business History Review. 1997. 
"Recasting the Organizational Synthesis: Structure and Process in the Twentieth and Twenty-First Centuries". Business History Review. 2005.
"The Business of History". Wall Street Journal. 2006.
"The Entrepreneurial Culture and the Mysteries of Economic Development". Essays in Economic & Business History. 2018.

References

1931 births
Living people
21st-century American historians
American male non-fiction writers
Yale Graduate School of Arts and Sciences alumni
Rice University faculty
Johns Hopkins University faculty
Place of birth missing (living people)
Economics journal editors
Business historians
Indiana University alumni
21st-century American male writers
Presidents of the Economic History Association